The Beloved of His Highness is a 1928 German silent comedy film directed by Jacob Fleck and Luise Fleck and starring Vivian Gibson, Mary Kid and Lia Eibenschütz. It was based on an operetta, by Jean Gilbert.

The film's sets were designed by the art director Willi Herrmann.

Cast

References

Bibliography

External links

1928 films
Films of the Weimar Republic
German silent feature films
Films directed by Jacob Fleck
Films directed by Luise Fleck
German black-and-white films
1928 comedy films
German comedy films
Films based on operettas
Silent comedy films
1920s German films
1920s German-language films